Linda McRae (born Linda Mae Humphries) is a Canadian folk-roots-Americana musician. A multi-instrumentalist (clawhammer banjo, acoustic and electric guitars, accordion, bass, and Porchboard stomp box) singer-songwriter, she is a former member of Spirit of the West. She has released five albums, Flying Jenny, Cryin’ Out Loud, Carve It to the Heart, Rough Edges and Ragged Hearts and her most recent release, a career retrospective entitled 50 Shades of Red (June 2014).

Career
She earned two platinum and three gold records as a long-time member of Spirit of the West. She left the band to resume her solo career and has since released four critically acclaimed recordings: Flying Jenny with producer Colin Linden (Bruce Cockburn, Bob Dylan), Cryin’ Out Loud, producer Gurf Morlix (Lucinda Williams, Mary Gauthier), Carve It to the Heart with Marc L’Esperance and herself as producers.

Her fourth release Rough Edges and Ragged Hearts she also produced with L’Esperance and featured performers including the Sojourners, Doug Cox, Gurf Morlix, Ray Bonneville and Samantha Parton (of Be Good Tanyas).  Charting No. 1 at CKUA, No. 4 Top Canadian Album, and Nos. 1 and 2 Top Canadian Songs ("Rough Edges & Ragged Hearts" and "Be Your Own Light") and No. 8 Top Canadian Artists on the Folk DJs list, the recording also earned five-star reviews in No Depression and Rock Star Weekly, and 4.5 stars in Penguin Eggs. As of November 2013 it's also been on the Roots Music Report charts for 50 weeks straight.

McRae's song "Burning Bridges" was also included on the Skydiggers summer 2013 CD entitled No. 1 Northern which included songs by Canadian artists Gordon Lightfoot, Ron Sexsmith, and Neil Young. Montreal Gazette, Metro Winnipeg, and the Nova Scotia Herald included her as among these Canadian "greats". Other co-recordings and performances include those with Bruce Cockburn, The Wonder Stuff, Neko Case, Alejandro Escovedo, and Ray Waylie Hubbard, and another with Gurf Morlix.

Recent performances include Plainsong Festival in Nebraska, Yukon Arts Centre, Vancouver Island Music Festival in British Columbia; South Country Fair in Alberta; Barbican Theatre, London; Maverick Festival, UK; the Bluebird Café, Nashville, Tennessee; and New Folsom Prison, California's infamous maximum-security prison where she performed and facilitated writing workshops for the inmates. These workshops lead to the creation of her Express Yourself Writing Workshops currently being presented in detox centres, alternative schools, and youth and adult correctional facilities across North America.

McRae has partnered with the following festivals to continue to present her workshop as part of their community outreach programs: Plainsong Festival (USA), South Country Fair (Canada), Coldsnap Festival (Canada), Hamburg Music Fest (USA), Vancouver Island Music Fest (Canada), Youth Rehabilitation and Treatment Center (USA), Folk Alliance International (USA), Bread and Roses (USA).

Discography

As self
Linda McRae, Going to the Well, October 2019
Linda McRae, Shadow Trails, September 2015
 Linda McRae, 50 Shades of Red, 2014
 Kenny Butterill, Troubadour Tales, 2014
 M.C. Hansen, He Was A Young Father (recorded in Whitehorse, Yukon in 2013) 
 Linda McRae Live, (recorded at The Sportsmentʼs Tavern, Buffalo, NY, 2013) 
 Linda McRae, Rough Edges & Ragged Hearts, 2012 
 Loretta Hagen, Mud and Stone, 2011 
 Jason Eklund, Jason Eklund, 2009 
 Paul Hyde, Love & the Great Depression, 2009 
 Joanne Mackell, Brand New Lonesome, 2008
 Linda McRae, Carve It to the Heart, 2007 
 The Boomchix, Surprise, Surprise, 2007 
 Rodney DeCroo, War Torn Man, 2006 
 The Knotty Pines, The Fabulous Sounds, 2005 
 Linda McRae, Escovedo 101, Compilation, 2004 
 The Turaeward Family, Deep Rooted Beefs, 2004 
 Rodney DeCroo, Rodney DeCroo and the Killers, 2004 
 Gurf Morlix, CutʼN Shoot, 2004 
 Eric Westbury, Burnt Tongues and Blue Truths, 2004 
 Linda McRae, Cryinʼ Out Loud, 2004 
 Leslie Alexander, Savage Country, 2003 
 John Guliak, The Black Monk, 2002 
 Women & Songs 6, Compilation, 2002 
 Jeff Gibbons, Love Tattoos, 2001 
 Neko Case, Furnace Room Lullaby, 2000 
 Jim Whitford, Poison in the Well, 2000 
 JT King, Ruby River, 2000 
 Nanaimo 8:38 Saturday Morning, Bob Bossin, 1999 
 Girls With Guitars, Volume 1, 1999 
 Bruce Cockburn, Where Have All the Flowers Gone, 1998 
 Linda McRae, Flying Jenny, 1997 
 Spirit of the West, Open Heart Symphony Live with the VSO, 1996 
 Spirit of the West, Two-Headed, 1995 
 The Waltons, Cockʼs Crow, 1995 
 Spirit of the West, Upfront! Canadians Live On Stage Various Artists, 1994 
 Spirit of the West, Faithlift, 1993 
 The Wonder Stuff, Will The Circle Be Unbroken, 1992 
 The Wonder Stuff, Welcome to the Cheap Seats, 1992 
 Spirit of the West, The Hanging Garden Joni Mitchell Compilation, 1997 
 Spirit of the West, Go Figure, 1991 
 Island of Circles, Donovan Compilation, 1991 
 Spirit of the West, Collected Works Compilation, 1991 
 Spirit of the West, Save This House, 1990 
 Terminal City, CITR Tapeathon, 1988 
 Terminal City, Live, 1987 
 Easy Money, Standing in Your Shadow, 1981 
 Easy Money, Getting Lost, 1981

As part of Spirit of the West
 Open Heart Symphony Live with the Vancouver Symphony Orchestra, 1996
 Two-Headed, 1995
 Upfront! Canadians Live On Stage Various Artists, 1994
 Faithlift, 1993
 The Hanging Garden, 1997
 Go Figure, 1991
 Collected Works compilation, 1991
 Save This House, 1990

References

External links
 Official website

Canadian alternative country singers
Canadian women singers
Canadian songwriters
Living people
Musicians from Vancouver
Writers from Vancouver
Canadian folk rock musicians
The Minus 5 members
Spirit of the West members
Year of birth missing (living people)
Black Hen Music artists
Stony Plain Records artists